The boys' singles tournament of the 2007 European Junior Badminton Championships was held from 4 to 8 April 2007. Rajiv Ouseph from England clinched this title in the last edition.

Seeds 

  Dmytro Zavadsky (quarter-finals)
  Lester Oey (semi-finals)
  Mads Conrad-Petersen (champion)
  Gabriel Ulldahl (final)
  Jakub Bitman (third round)
  Fabian Hammes (third round)
  Pedro Martins (quarter-finals)
  Kieran Merrilees (quarter-finals)

  Nikita Khakimov (third round)
  Maciej Kowalik (first round)
  Martin Kragh (third round)
  Hallstein Oma (second round)
  Maxime Renault (third round)
  Lukas Schmidt (third round)
  Ivan Sozonov (third round)
  Quintus Thies (first round)

Draw

Finals

Top half

Section 1

Section 2

Bottom half

Section 3

Section 4

References

External links 
Tournament Link

2007 European Junior Badminton Championships